Mats Wilander defeated the defending champion Ivan Lendl in the final, 3–6, 6–4, 6–2, 6–2 to win the men's singles tennis title at the 1985 French Open. It was his second French Open title.

Seeds
The seeded players are listed below. Mats Wilander is the champion; others show the round in which they were eliminated.

  John McEnroe (semifinals)
  Ivan Lendl (finalist)
  Jimmy Connors (semifinals)
  Mats Wilander (champion)
  Andrés Gómez (third round)
  Anders Järryd (fourth round)
  Joakim Nyström (quarterfinals)
  Eliot Teltscher (second round)
  Yannick Noah (fourth round)
  Aaron Krickstein (fourth round)
  Miloslav Mečíř (third round)
  Henrik Sundström (fourth round)
  Tomáš Šmíd (fourth round)
  Stefan Edberg (quarterfinals)
  Brad Gilbert (first round)
  Jimmy Arias (first round)

Draw

Key
 Q = Qualifier
 WC = Wild card
 LL = Lucky loser
 r = Retired

Finals

Section 1

Section 2

Section 3

Section 4

Section 5

Section 6

Section 7

Section 8

External links
 Association of Tennis Professionals (ATP) – 1985 French Open Men's Singles draw
1985 French Open – Men's draws and results at the International Tennis Federation

Men's Singles
French Open by year – Men's singles
1985 Grand Prix (tennis)